Cawnpore–Barabanki Railway (C–B) (1943-1953) (earlier called Cawnpore–Burhwal Railway (1894-1943) was a railway in northern India.
It was managed as part of the East Indian Railway, and was worked by the Bengal and North Western Railway and the Rohilkund and Kumaon Railway.

History 

Cawnpore–Burhwal Railway was sanctioned for construction in October 1894 to provide a link between the metre gauge railways, north of the Ganga river with the Rajputana-Malwa Railway system. The construction was commenced in November 1894. The line was constructed alongside the broad gauge from Cawnpore via Lucknow to a junction with Bengal and North Western Railway at Burhwal 160 km away. The metre gauge line between Burhwal and Daliganj on the Lucknow–Bareilly Railway was opened on 24 November 1896. The line was later extended to Barabanki. The line was 29 km long. The metre gauge Cawnpore-Aishbagh section of the Cawnpore–Burhwal Railway (metre gauge link) was opened for goods traffic on 25 April 1897. The line was 72 km long.

The Railway was essentially the common stem of the Bengal and North Western Railway and Rohilkund and Kumaon Railway networks. The Cawnpore–Burwhal Railway was renamed the Cawnpore–Barabanki Railway around 1943. The Cawnpore–Barabanki Railway was transferred to the North Eastern Railway on 27 February 1953.

Conversion to broad gauge 

The CBR was converted to  broad gauge in 2014.

References

Transport in Kanpur
Metre gauge railways in India
Defunct railway companies of India
Railway companies established in 1894
Railway companies disestablished in 1943
Railway companies established in 1943
Railway companies disestablished in 1953
History of rail transport in Uttar Pradesh
Transport in Barabanki, Uttar Pradesh